Mammea papuana is a species of flowering plant in the Calophyllaceae family. It is found only in Papua New Guinea.

References

papuana
Flora of Papua New Guinea
Vulnerable plants
Taxonomy articles created by Polbot
Plants described in 1956